Werner Oechslin (born 1944) is a Swiss historian and author.

Life 

He was born in 1944.

He studied art history, archeology, philosophy and mathematics in Zurich and Rome.

Career 

Since 1985, he has been a professor of history at the Swiss Federal Institute of Technology.

He is a founder of the Werner Oechslin Library.

Bibliography 

His notable books are:

 Festival Architecture Rome 
 Byrne: Six Books of Euclid 
 Otto Wagner, Adolf Loos, and the Road to Modern Architecture 
 Alberto Camenzind: Architect

References

External links
 https://www.gta.arch.ethz.ch/staff/werner-oechslin/curriculum-vitae-en

20th-century Swiss historians
21st-century Swiss historians
Living people
1944 births
Academic staff of ETH Zurich